The 1920 Texas A&M Aggies football team represented Texas A&M during the 1920 college football season.

Schedule

References

Texas AandM
Texas A&M Aggies football seasons
Texas AandM